Emmanuel Episcopal Church is a historic Episcopal church located at Powhatan, Powhatan County, Virginia. It was built between 1842 and 1850, and is a one-story, vernacular Gothic Revival brick church building painted white.  It features a stepped gable parapet, a half-octagonal apse which served as a vestry, and four tall window bays interspaced with slim buttresses. It also contains a cemetery in the back yard and north side of the church.

It was added to the National Register of Historic Places in 1990.

References

Episcopal churches in Virginia
Churches on the National Register of Historic Places in Virginia
Gothic Revival church buildings in Virginia
Churches completed in 1850
Buildings and structures in Powhatan County, Virginia
National Register of Historic Places in Powhatan County, Virginia
19th-century Episcopal church buildings